Croydon Underpass is an underpass located in Croydon, London. The road is part of the A212 which stretches from Catford to Forestdale. The underpass was constructed beneath the junction of George Street and Wellesley Road/Park Lane in the early 1960s. The underpass was built mainly to prevent traffic congestion on Park Lane above the underpass. 

The Nestlé Tower, a landmark in Croydon, is located on top of the underpass, along with the Fairfield Halls and Croydon Clocktower. A new Central Croydon Travelodge was opened in 2006, opposite the Whitgift Centre. The Croydon Flyover is very close to the underpass.

References

Streets in the London Borough of Croydon
Tunnels in London